Charis Elizabeth Kubrin is an American criminologist and Professor of Criminology, Law and Society at the University of California, Irvine (UCI).

Education and career
After receiving her Ph.D. from the University of Washington in 2000, Kubrin taught at George Washington University for 11 years; she left George Washington University for UCI in the summer of 2011. In 2016, she and her UCI colleague Carroll Seron served as editors of a special issue of the Annals of the American Academy of Political and Social Science about prison realignment in California.

Research
Kubrin's research focuses on, among other topics, the relationship between race, violence, and social disorganization theory. She has also researched the perception of rap music as violent and dangerous, as well as whether a rapper's music can be used as evidence against him in a court of law. With Graham Ousey, she has also studied the relationship between immigration and crime in the United States, finding that immigration is related to lower rates of crime and violence in U.S. neighborhoods.  Kubrin has stated that the Public Safety Realignment initiative was not a factor in the 2019 California stabbing rampage.

References

External links
Faculty page

University of California, Irvine faculty
Living people
American criminologists
University of Washington alumni
Smith College alumni
George Washington University faculty
American women social scientists
American women criminologists
Year of birth missing (living people)